Damian Jakubik (born 25 March 1990) is a Polish professional footballer who plays as a right-back for Radomiak Radom.

Honours

Club
Radomiak Radom
I liga: 2020–21
II liga: 2018–19

References

External links

1990 births
Living people
Polish footballers
Ząbkovia Ząbki players
Górnik Łęczna players
Podbeskidzie Bielsko-Biała players
Znicz Pruszków players
Radomiak Radom players
Ekstraklasa players
I liga players
II liga players
Association football defenders
People from Otwock